{{Taxobox
| name = Dendrocoelopsis
| image = Dendrocoelopsis alaskensis.jpg
| image_width = 240px
| image_caption = Dendrocoelopsis alaskensis
| regnum = Animalia
| phylum = Platyhelminthes
| ordo = Tricladida
| subordo = Continenticola
| familia = Dendrocoelidae
| genus = Dendrocoelopsis
| genus_authority = Kenk, 1930
| subdivision_ranks = Species
| subdivision = 
See text<ref>Tyler S, Schilling S, Hooge M, and Bush LF (comp.) (2006-2012) Turbellarian taxonomic database. Version 1.7  Database </ref>
}}Dendrocoelopsis is a genus of freshwater triclad.

 Species D. alaskensisD. americanaD. beauchampiD. bessoniD. brementiD. chattoniD. ezensisD. hyamanaeD. ichikawaiD. kishidaeD. lacteaD. oculataD. piriformisD. sinensisD. spinosipenisD. siufenhensisD. vaginataD. vandeli''

References 

Dendrocoelidae